Sai Sha Road is a main road connecting Sai Kung and Ma On Shan. It begins at the roundabout at Mak Pin, Sai Kung and passes through Three Fathoms Cove and Shap Sze Heung before traversing the new town of Ma On Shan and Wu Kai Sha and ending at Hang Tak Street in Tai Shui Hang.

The MTR Tuen Ma line track section between Heng On station and Wu Kai Sha station is placed directly above Sai Sha Road. Other than MTR stations, several estates lie next to the road. The length of the road is approximately 11.2 km. Despite the road having close to no slope, it includes many bends.

Cycling is prohibited along most of Sai Sha Road on Sundays and public holidays, presumably due to its narrow width, continuous double white lines and insufficient passing places along the section from near Nai Chung bus stop to Mak Pin roundabout, where cycling is not allowed.

History
Construction of the road began in the late 1970s. It originally stretched from Tai Mong Tsai to Nai Chung, hence the original name of the road was Nai Chung Access Road. In 1986, its name was altered to Sai Sha Road and has retained this name since then. Two years later, it was open to traffic, with the connection between Sha Tin New Town and Ma On Shan finally complete.

See also

 Shui Long Wo

Sai Kung District
Sha Tin District
Tai Po District
Roads in the New Territories